Darlia is a monotypic genus of moth in the family Gelechiidae containing the single species Darlia praetexta. It was described by J. F. Gates Clarke in 1950. It is only found in Argentina.

The wingspan is 10–11 mm. The forewings are greyish fuscous, with a large sordid-white spot near the middle of the wing and a sordid-white transverse outwardly angulate fascia from the costa, near the apex extending to the center, then inwardly angulate to the tornus. This fascia is sometimes incomplete and consists of
costal and tornal spots. The hindwings are light shining grey.

References 

Moths described in 1950
Gelechiinae
Fauna of Argentina